TOG is a hackerspace in Dublin, Ireland. tóg is a word in the Irish language; one of its meanings is 'to build or construct'.

History 
The project was started in January 2009 and the space opened in May 2009. In June 2010, TOG moved to a new, larger building on Chancery Lane (Unit 3), Dublin 8. In January 2015 it was confirmed that the lease on this building would not be extended beyond April 2015, and TOG announced its intention to move to a new premises in Dublin city centre. In the event the lease was extended through October and TOG moved to its new premises, the ground floor of 22 Blackpitts, in mid-October 2015.

Structure 
TOG is a community-operated physical locale based run by its members to provide a shared space. The members have a place to be creative and work on their projects in an environment designed to be both inspiring and supportive of both new and old technologies. The space is funded for by its members and allows members 24-hour access to a place equipped with shared equipment supplied or donated by members or friends of TOG.

TOG allows for a community that would usually be based through virtual medium to come together to form a meeting place for like-minded individuals. TOG allows people to collaborate on projects in a centralized place to bring the skills of many people together to get a task or project done.

Events

National Events
TOG has group nights on Mondays with Electronics and Micro-controllers, and Wednesdays with Coding where the space is available for people to work on their projects and also get help with any problems that may be having from 7PM weekly, and semi-regular Craft nights.

Members of TOG have also spoken (or plan to speak) at technology related conferences around Ireland, such as
 OSSBarcamp, September 2009
 PyCon Ireland (the Python Ireland annual conference)
 Ubuntu Ireland and Skynet talks
 TechWeek at DCU

TOG has also hosted events for Engineers Week and Science Week. a

TOG, in association with the Irish Robotics Club, hosted an electronics workshop with Mitch Altman from San Francisco's hackerspace Noisebridge, and Jimmie P. Rodgers, in the Science Gallery, Dublin.

TOG has also held events as part of the Innovation Dublin Festival

TOG has also taken part in Dublin Art and Technology Association's (DATA) 'DATA EVENT 37.0' at the Irish Museum of Contemporary Art (IMOCA).

TOG has also participated in the annual Dublin Maker event, which attracts over 10,000 attendees.

Global Events

Members of TOG have also taken part in several 'Synchronous Hackathons', live simultaneous hacking events with other hackerspaces.

TOG has also streamed and had events while the Chaos Communication Congress (CCC) occurs in Berlin. Members in Dublin who are unable to go to Berlin are able to attend TOG and watch talks etc. TOG members also meet up with members of other hackerspaces at events like CCC

TOG also took part in the Global Hackerspace Cupcake Challenge, where participating hackerspaces send a cupcake to each other. The TOG cupcake was sent to Artifactory in Perth, Australia. TOG received a cupcake from Alpha One Labs in New York, USA.

References

Nearby hackerspaces

 091 Labs in Galway, Ireland
 MilkLabs in Limerick, Ireland

External links
 TOG website
 Hackerspaces.org page on TOG
 Hackerspaces.org page on Dublin

Hacker groups
Computer clubs
Hackerspaces
2009 establishments in Ireland